Sergei Valeryevich Gorbok (born 4 December 1982) is a retired Belarusian-born Russian handball player.

References

External links

1982 births
Living people
Russian male handball players
Sportspeople from Minsk
Expatriate handball players
Russian expatriate sportspeople in Belarus
Russian expatriate sportspeople in Germany
Russian expatriate sportspeople in Hungary
Russian expatriate sportspeople in North Macedonia
Russian expatriate sportspeople in Ukraine
Rhein-Neckar Löwen players
Handball-Bundesliga players
SC Pick Szeged players
ZTR players
RK Vardar players